Wolfwalkers is a 2020 independent animated fantasy adventure film directed by Tomm Moore and Ross Stewart. The film is the third and final installment in Moore's "Irish Folklore Trilogy", following his previous films The Secret of Kells (2009) and Song of the Sea (2014). An international co-production led by Cartoon Saloon and Mélusine Productions, the film premiered at the 2020 Toronto International Film Festival on September 12 and was released theatrically in the United Kingdom on October 26, in the United States and Canada on November 13, and in Ireland on December 2. It was released digitally on Apple TV+ on December 11, 2020, to critical acclaim.

Wolfwalkers follows the story of Robyn Goodfellowe, a young apprentice hunter who arrives in Ireland with her father during a time of superstition and magic to wipe out the last wolf pack. While exploring the forbidden lands outside the city walls, Robyn befriends a free-spirited girl, Mebh, a member of a mysterious tribe rumored to have the ability to turn into wolves by night. As they search for Mebh's missing mother, Robyn uncovers a secret that draws her further into the enchanted world of the Wolfwalkers and risks turning into the very thing her father is tasked to destroy.

The film stars the voices of Honor Kneafsey, Eva Whittaker, Sean Bean, Simon McBurney, Maria Doyle Kennedy, Tommy Tiernan, Jon Kenny and John Morton. It won several awards including the Satellite Award for Best Animated or Mixed Media Feature and five Annie Awards including Best Director for Moore and Stewart and Best Independent Animated Feature. It also received the nominations for Best Animated Feature Film at the Academy Awards, Golden Globe Awards and BAFTA Awards.

Plot

In Ireland in 1650, the residents of the town of Kilkenny are working to clear the nearby woods under orders from the authoritarian Lord Protector, putting them at odds with a wolf pack who have been terrorising the villagers. English hunter, Bill Goodfellowe, with his rebellious daughter Robyn, has been summoned to Kilkenny by the Lord Protector to exterminate the wolves. Bill goes out into the woods to place traps for the wolves, leaving his daughter alone at home. Wanting to help Bill, Robyn secretly follows him out of town with her pet falcon, Merlyn, in an attempt to kill a wolf. However, once at the edge of the woods, she is soon attacked by the pack. After accidentally shooting Merlyn with her crossbow while trying to kill a wolf, Robyn watches a mysterious girl take him into the woods and follows them. Upon finding Merlyn miraculously healed, she is startled into a trap when one of the wolves confronts her. The wolf begins trying to help her escape, but she mistakes this for aggression and tries to fight it, causing it to bite her. Once out of the trap, Merlyn and the wolf lead Robyn to the wolves' den, where she discovers the wolf is the same girl from earlier. The girl, Mebh, explains she is a “Wolfwalker”, whose spirit leaves her body and becomes a wolf when she sleeps. Robyn comes to befriend Mebh, and also learns that her dormant mother Moll's spirit has not yet returned in her search for a new home for their pack, leaving Mebh alone to take care of them. Returning home, Robyn tries to convince Bill of the existence of Wolfwalkers, but he instead scolds her for going into the forest, and insists that she take up work to occupy herself.

The next morning, while working at the scullery, as ordered by the Lord Protector, Robyn is drawn into his chambers by a mysterious voice coming from a concealed cage, but is soon ushered out by the head maid. That night, as she sleeps, Robyn discovers her soul has left her body and has become a wolf. Shocked and confused, Robyn returns to the woods where Mebh reveals her bite has turned Robyn into a Wolfwalker like her, and helps her get accustomed to her new form. Upon returning to Kilkenny, Robyn infiltrates the Lord Protector's manor where she finds Moll's wolf form inside the cage. Moll tells Robyn that Mebh and the pack must leave the forest, as the Lord Protector plans to burn it down to wipe them out. The Lord Protector, seeking to restore control of the town, assures the townspeople that he can tame the wolves, and by extension, nature itself. He ignores Robyn's pleas to let Moll go and demotes Bill for failing to eliminate the wolves.

Fearing separation from each other, Robyn and Bill tend to their duties. Mebh, having waited for Robyn to return on a promise from the previous night, enters Kilkenny and finds Robyn, who attempts to relay her mother's warning, but Mebh, hurt by Robyn's refusal to help rescue her mother out of concern for her safety, resolves to do it alone. The Lord Protector presents the captured Moll before the townspeople, showing his control over the wolves. An enraged Mebh attempts to free her but when Bill restrains her, Moll bites him. Mebh vows to return with her pack to rescue her mother before finally fleeing. The Lord Protector orders Bill to kill Moll and leads his army to burn the forest down.

However, Robyn protects Moll from Bill, before she frees and reunites her with Mebh before she and her pack can attack Kilkenny, earning Mebh's forgiveness. Bill follows them and shoots Moll, causing Moll's wolf form to become a spirit and return to her human form in the den, with Robyn, Mebh, and the wolves following it. The Lord Protector and his army arrive and begin burning the forest. As Mebh works to heal a grievously wounded Moll using the same magic used on Merlyn, Robyn and the pack stall the soldiers. Mebh summons Robyn and her pack back, realizing she needs them present to heal Moll, but Robyn is knocked unconscious after disabling the army's cannon. Before the Lord Protector can kill her, Bill, due to Moll's bite, becomes a Wolfwalker and protects her. After being bitten by Bill and horrified that he too had become a Wolfwalker the Lord Protector throws himself into a waterfall, praying for salvation as he falls.

Robyn and Bill return to the den and help Mebh revive Moll, and accept her invitation to stay with the pack and embrace their new identities as Wolfwalkers. They set off to find a new home, ending with the two girls falling asleep in their moving caravan, only to wake up as wolves and chase each other into the sunset, surrounded by the pack, and a content Bill and Moll.

Voice cast

Production
On September 8, 2018, it was announced that Apple had acquired Tomm Moore and Ross Stewart's Wolfwalkers from a script by Will Collins. The film is an original concept that was created by Moore and Stewart, and its animation uses a unique 2D style alternating between a woodblock aesthetic and loose expressive line work.

Music
Moore's frequent collaborators, Bruno Coulais and folk group Kíla, provided the film's original score. Norwegian singer-songwriter Aurora contributed to the soundtrack with a re-recorded version of her single "Running with the Wolves".

Animation and design
The animation of Wolfwalkers was primarily drawn by hand using TVPaint with digital brushes to imitate physical pencil lines. Some crowds and background elements were animated with Moho. Backgrounds were drawn and painted on paper.

The film's visual design uses contrasting styles to represent the conflict between the forest and the town of Kilkenny. The town and its inhabitants are drawn in a style inspired by 17th century woodcuts using thick lines and angular, geometric shapes. This represents the cage-like nature of the town and the Lord Protector's rules. In contrast, the forest, animals, and wolfwalker characters are drawn with sketchy and expressive linework with curving shapes to convey the freedom and liveliness of the forest. Robyn's design starts out with the woodblock appearance of the town, but as she comes to identify more with the wolfwalkers her design transitions to the sketchy pencil lines of the forest. The art style of the forest characters also includes intentional pencil construction lines which would normally be removed by a clean-up department. The directors were inspired by the rough, expressive animation of The Tale of the Princess Kaguya and the Xeroxed animation of One Hundred and One Dalmatians which preserved the pencilled art of the animators. Tomm Moore said he had the idea that "it would be great to make a virtue of the fact that it's hand drawn and to really make it look like a Glen Keane line test or something like really, really rough and scratchy."

Certain first-person shots in the film, called "wolfvision", depict Robyn's point of view as she moves through the environment as a wolf. Many of the wolfvision scenes required a dynamic camera that mimicked the natural movement of Robyn's head as she ran. To achieve this Eimhin McNamara, the wolfvision supervisor, developed a technique that combined 3D technology with traditional hand-drawn art. McNamara's team constructed a 3D forest environment with the virtual reality painting software Quill with further refinement and stylisation done in Blender. This allowed him to previsualise the scene and adjust the camera as needed. Each frame of the CG animation was then printed out in magenta which the artists drew over with pencil and charcoal to match the film's hand-drawn look. The frames were then scanned and the underlying magenta was digitally removed. McNamara said that this technique is "just about getting an organic thing on screen that looks like people made it".

Release
The film had its world premiere at the 2020 Toronto International Film Festival on 12 September 2020.

It was released theatrically on 26 October 2020 by Wildcard Distribution in the United Kingdom and on 13 November by GKIDS in the United States and Canada.

Child Film distributes it in Japan and Value & Power Culture Communications will distribute in China.

The theatrical release in Ireland was planned for the same day as the UK, but was delayed until later in the year due to the enforced closure of cinemas across the country in response to the COVID-19 pandemic. It was instead released on 2 December 2020.

The film debuted on Apple TV+ on 11 December 2020, and was later released theatrically in France on 16 December by Haut et Court. In March, Deadline announced that Wolfwalkers would be re-released to select theaters in North America, starting on 19 March 2021 with the Angelika Film Center in New York.

A release on Blu-Ray Disc with bonus features is exclusively featured in the Irish Folklore Trilogy box set in the US and UK/Ireland also containing The Secret of Kells, Song of the Sea and a bonus disc. GKIDS and Shout! Factory released the Region A box set in North America on December 14, 2021, while StudioCanal released the box set in the UK and Ireland on December 20, 2021 (Originally planned for December 13).

Reception

Box office
, Wolfwalkers has earned $231,380 at the global box office. According to Moore, the film cost €10 million to produce.

Critical response
 The website's critical consensus reads, "A mesmerizing Celtic-inspired adventure, Wolfwalkers offers an epic ethereal fantasy matched by profound philosophies and stellar voice work." On Metacritic, the film has a weighted average score of 87 out of 100, based on 28 reviews, indicating "universal acclaim".

Sam Adams of Slate called it the best animated movie of the year to date, praising the beauty and technical ability of the animation. Peter Debruge of Variety wrote: "In the decade since Kells, it's not just the technological advances that make Moore's latest so impressive, but the rapidly changing cultural conversations as well. He brings everything together by borrowing from timeless visual influences, leaving audiences with another stunning artwork for the ages."

Accolades

Metacritic summarized various critics end-of-year top lists, and ranked Wolfwalkers in 26th place overall. IndieWires poll of 231 critics included Wolfwalkers in its Best Movies of 2020, ranking in 32nd place.

Future
During an interview in 2021, Moore stated that there are currently no plans for a Wolfwalkers sequel, just like his previous films The Secret of Kells and Song of the Sea have no sequels.

References

External links
 
 
 
  on Apple TV

 "A First Look at Wolfwalkers, Tomm Moore's New Feature" on Cartoon Brew
 "1st Look: Wolfwalkers Trailer is a Celtic-Inspired Delight" on Krypton Radio

2020 animated films
2020 fantasy films
2020 films
2020s fantasy adventure films
2020s French animated films
2020s historical fantasy films
English-language Irish films
English-language French films
English-language Luxembourgian films
Animated films based on Celtic mythology
French animated fantasy films
Films scored by Bruno Coulais
Films set in the Middle Ages
Irish animated fantasy films
Irish independent films
Luxembourgian animated fantasy films
2020s children's adventure films
2020s children's fantasy films
Werewolves in animated film
Animated films about wolves
Irish animated films
Cultural depictions of Oliver Cromwell
Films directed by Tomm Moore
Films set in the 1650s
French animated feature films
Apple TV+ original films
Anime-influenced Western animation
2020s children's animated films
Animated coming-of-age films
Animated films about friendship
Films about animals
Films about prejudice
Films set in Ireland
Annie Award winners
Cartoon Saloon films
Films about father–daughter relationships
Screen Ireland films
Canal+ films
Irish children's films
2020s French films
2020 independent films